Selliguea is a fern genus in the family Polypodiaceae. The type species is Selliguea feei.

Species list
Species list taken from Hassler & Swale (2002). These are not necessarily accepted species.
 Selliguea albicaula (Copel.) M.Kato & M.G.Price; Acta Phytotax. Geobot. 41(1-3): 72 (1990)
 Selliguea albidopaleata (Copel.) Parris; Parris, R.S.Beaman & Beaman, Pl. Mt. Kinabalu, 1. Ferns & Fern Allies: 151 (1992)
 Selliguea albidosquamata (Blume) Parris; Parris, R.S.Beaman & Beaman, Pl. Mt. Kinabalu, 1. Ferns & Fern Allies: 152 (1992)
 Selliguea albopes (C. Chr. & Ching) S.G.Lu, Hovenkamp & M.G.Gilbert, Fl. China 2–3: 782 (2013)
 Selliguea archboldii Copel.; Journ. Arnold Arbor. 24: 442 (1943)
 Selliguea bakeri (Luerss.) Hovenkamp; Blumea 43: 90 (1998)
 Selliguea balbi Hovenkamp; Blumea 43: 108 (1998)
 Selliguea banaensis (C. Chr.) comb. ined.
 Selliguea bellisquamata (C. Chr.) Hovenkamp; Blumea 43: 90 (1998)
 Selliguea bisulcata (Hook.) Hovenkamp; Blumea 43: 73 (1998)
 Selliguea brooksii (Alderw.) Hovenkamp; Blumea 43: 93 (1998)
 Selliguea caudiformis (Bl.) J. Sm.; Ferns br. and for. 97 (1866)
 Selliguea ceratophylla (Copel.) Hovenkamp; Blumea 43: 86 (1998)
 Selliguea chenkouensis (Ching) comb. ined.
 Selliguea chinensis (Ching) comb. ined.
 Selliguea chrysotricha (C. Chr.) comb. ined.
 Selliguea conjuncta (Ching)  S.G.Lu, Hovenkamp & M.G.Gilbert, Fl. China 2–3: 784 (2013)
 Selliguea connexa (Ching)  S.G.Lu, Hovenkamp & M.G.Gilbert, Fl. China 2–3: 780 (2013)
 Selliguea costulata (Ces.) Wagner & Grether; Univ. Calif. Publ. Bot. 23: 60. t.22 (1948)
 Selliguea craspedosora (Copel.) Hovenkamp; Blumea 43: 72 (1998)
 Selliguea crenatopinnata (C. B. Clarke) comb. ined. 
 Selliguea cretifera (Alderw.) Ching; Sunyatsenia 5: 260 (1940)
 Selliguea cruciformis (Ching) S.G.Lu, Hovenkamp & M.G.Gilbert, Fl. China 2–3: 783 (2013)
 Selliguea cunea (Ching) comb. ined.
 Selliguea dactylina (Christ) comb. ined.
 Selliguea dekockii (Alderw.) Hovenkamp; Blumea 43: 40 (1998)
 Selliguea digitata (Ching) comb. ined.
 Selliguea ebenipes (Hook.) comb. ined.
 Selliguea echinospora (Tag.) comb. ined.
 Selliguea elmeri (Copel. in Perkins) Ching; Sunyatsenia 6: 260 (1940)
 Selliguea enervis (Cav.) Ching; Bull. Fan Mem. Inst. Biol. Bot. 10: 239 (1941)
 Selliguea engleri (Luerss.) comb. ined.
 Selliguea erythrocarpa (Mett. ex Kuhn) comb. ined.
 Selliguea feei Bory; Dict. class. 6: 588 (1824)
 Selliguea feeoides Copel.; Bishop Mus. Bull. 69. 17 (1929)
 Selliguea ferrea (Brause) Hovenkamp; Blumea 43: 43 (1998)
 Selliguea fukienensis (Ching) comb. ined.
 Selliguea glauca (J.Sm. ex Brackenr.) Hovenkamp; Blumea 43: 56 (1998)
 Selliguea glaucopsis (Franchet) comb. ined.
 Selliguea gracilipes (Alderw.) Hovenkamp; Blumea 43: 83 (1998)
 Selliguea griffithiana (Hook.) comb. ined.
 Selliguea hainanensis (Ching) comb. ined.
 Selliguea hastata (Thunb.) comb. ined.
 Selliguea hellwigii (Diels in K.Schum. & Laut.) Hovenkamp; Blumea 43: 82 (1998)
 Selliguea heterocarpa (Bl.) Bl.; Enum. addend. (1828)
 Selliguea hirsuta (Tag. & lwatsuki) comb. ined.
 Selliguea hirtella (Ching) comb. ined.
 Selliguea hunyaensis (Ching) comb. ined.
 Selliguea integerrima (Ching) comb. ined.
 Selliguea katuii (Brownlie) comb. ined.
 Selliguea kingpingensis (Ching) comb. ined.
 Selliguea kwangtungensis (Ching) comb. ined.
 Selliguea laciniata (C. Presl) Hovenkamp; Blumea 43: 47 (1998)
 Selliguea lagunensis (Christ) Hovenkamp; Blumea 43: 55 (1998)
 Selliguea laipoensis (Ching) comb. ined.
 Selliguea lancea (Ching & Wang) comb. ined.
 Selliguea lanceola (Mett.) E. Fourn.; Ann. sc. nat. V. 18: 280 (1873)
 Selliguea lateritia (Bak.) Hovenkamp; Blumea 43: 71 (1998)
 Selliguea lauterbachii (Alderw.) Hovenkamp; Blumea 43: 41 (1998)
 Selliguea likiangensis (Ching) comb. ined.
 Selliguea majoensis (C. Chr.) comb. ined.
 Selliguea malacodon (Hook.) comb. ined.
 Selliguea metacoela (Alderw.) Parris; Parris, R.S.Beaman & Beaman, Pl. Mt. Kinabalu, 1. Ferns & Fern Allies: 152 (1992)
 Selliguea montana (Sledge) comb. ined.
 Selliguea murudensis (C. Chr.) Parris; Parris, R.S.Beaman & Beaman, Pl. Mt. Kinabalu, 1. Ferns & Fern Allies: 152 (1992)
 Selliguea neglecta (Bl.) Hovenkamp; Blumea 43: 88 (1998)
 Selliguea nigropaleacea (Ching) comb. ined.
 Selliguea nigrovenia (Christ) comb. ined.
 Selliguea oblongifolia (S. K. Wu) comb. ined.
 Selliguea obtusa (Ching) comb. ined.
 Selliguea omeiensis (Ching) comb. ined.
 Selliguea oodes (Kunze) Hovenkamp; Blumea 43: 89 (1998)
 Selliguea oxyloba (Wallich ex Kunze) comb. ined.
 Selliguea palmatifida (Ching & P.S.Chiu) comb. ined.
 Selliguea pampylocarpa (Alderw.) Hovenkamp; Blumea 43: 87 (1998)
 Selliguea pellucidifolia (Hayata) comb. ined.
 Selliguea pianmaensis (W.M.Chu) comb. ined.
 Selliguea pingpienensis (Ching) comb. ined.
 Selliguea plantaginea Brackenr.; Expl. Exp. 16: 58 (1854)
 Selliguea platyphylla (Swartz) Ching; Bull. Fan Mem. Inst. Biol. Bot. 10: 238 (1941)
 Selliguea pseudoacrosticha (Alderw.) Hovenkamp; Blumea 43: 94 (1998)
 Selliguea pyrolifolia (Goldm. in Meyen) Hovenkamp; Blumea 43: 58 (1998)
 Selliguea quasidivaricata (Hayata) comb. ined.
 Selliguea rhynchophylla (Hook.) comb. ined.
 Selliguea rigida (Hook.) Hovenkamp; Blumea 43: 92 (1998)
 Selliguea roseomarginata (Ching) comb. ined.
 Selliguea rotunda (Ching) comb. ined.
 Selliguea setacea (Copel.) Hovenkamp; Blumea 43: 92 (1998)
 Selliguea shandongensis (J.X.Li & C.Y. Wang) comb. ined.
 Selliguea shensiensis (Christ) comb. ined.
 Selliguea similis (Ching) comb. ined.
 Selliguea simplicifolia (Ching) comb. ined.
 Selliguea simplicissima (F.Muell.) Hovenkamp; Blumea 43: 61 (1998)
 Selliguea soridens (Hook.) Hovenkamp; Blumea 43: 65 (1998)
 Selliguea sri-ratu Hovenkamp; Blumea 41(1): 19 (1996)
 Selliguea stenophylla (Blume) Parris; Parris, R.S.Beaman & Beaman, Pl. Mt. Kinabalu, I. Ferns & Fern Allies: 151 (1992)
 Selliguea stenosquamis Hovenkamp; Blumea 33(2): 396 (1988)
 Selliguea stewartii (Bedd.) comb. ined.
 Selliguea suboxyloba (Ching) comb. ined.
 Selliguea subsparsa (Bak.) Hovenkamp; Blumea 43: 80 (1998)
 Selliguea subtaeniata (Alderw.) Hovenkamp; Blumea 43: 80 (1998)
 Selliguea taeniata (Sw.) Parris; Parris, R.S.Beaman & Beaman, Pl. Mt. Kinabalu, 1. Ferns & Fern Allies: 152 (1992)
 Selliguea tafana (C. Chr.) Hovenkamp; Blumea 43: 36 (1998)
 Selliguea taiwanensis (Tag.) comb. ined.
 Selliguea tamdaoensis (V.N.Tu) comb. ined.
 Selliguea tarningensis (Ching) comb. ined.
 Selliguea tenuipes (Ching) comb. ined.
 Selliguea tibetana (Ching & S. K. Wu) comb. ined.
 Selliguea triloba (Houtt.) M.G.Price; Contr. Univ. Michigan Herb. 17: 276 (1990)
 Selliguea triquetra (Blume) Ching; Bull. Fan Mem. Inst. Biol. Bot. 10: 238 (1941)
 Selliguea violascens (Mett.) Hovenkamp; Blumea 43: 53 (1998)
 Selliguea waltonii (Ching) comb. ined.
 Selliguea whitfordii (Copel.) Hovenkamp; Blumea 43: 60 (1998)
 Selliguea wuliangshanensis (W.M.Chu) comb. ined.
 Selliguea wuyishanica (Ching & Shing) comb. ined.
 Selliguea yakuinsularis (Masam.) comb. ined.
 Selliguea yakushimensis (Makino) comb. ined.

References

External links

 Selliguea on http://homepages.caverock.net.nz
 Inaturalist: Some images of Selliguea species

 
Fern genera
Taxa named by Jean Baptiste Bory de Saint-Vincent

ja:ミツデウラボシ属